The Book of the Nine Rocks is an anonymous 14th century German mystical text.

Contents
The Book of the Nine Rocks uses the metaphor of jumping from rock to rock to illustrate the soul’s journey to God. Each rock represents a higher level of spirituality and each is more difficult to reach. While most men do not escape Satan’s snares and fall back into worldliness, the few who attain the highest rock transcend desire and self-will to realize their divine nature and become one with God.

Authorship
Uncertainly attributed to Rulman Merswin, who was associated with the Friends of God.

See also

Friends of God 
Christian mystics

References

14th-century Christian texts
Visionary literature
History of Christianity in Germany
History of mystic traditions